The 1960 Texas Tech Red Raiders football team represented Texas Technological College—now known as Texas Tech University—as a member of the Southwest Conference (SWC) during the 1960 NCAA University Division football season. In their tenth and final season under head coach DeWitt Weaver, the Red Raiders compiled a 3–6–1 record (1–5–1 against conference opponents), finished in sixth place in the SWC, and were outscored by opponents by a combined total of 182 to 148. The team's statistical leaders included Glenn Amerson with 464 passing yards, Coolidge Hunt with 527 rushing yards, and Bake Turner with 173 receiving yards. The team played its home games at Clifford B. and Audrey Jones Stadium.

Schedule

References

Texas Tech
Texas Tech Red Raiders football seasons
Texas Tech Red Raiders football